In military and naval warfare, littoral warfare is operations in and around the littoral zone, within a certain distance of shore, including surveillance, mine-clearing and support for landing operations and other types of combat shifting from water to ground, and back.

Definition
Littoral warfare is warfare in and around the littoral zone.

History
Littoral warfare has been conducted almost as long as human societies have been conducting warfare.

In the 21st century the United States Marine Corps re-emphasized littoral warfare.

See also
 Amphibious warfare
 Littoral combat ship

References

Combat